The term negative return is used in business or finance to describe a loss, i.e., a negative return on investment. By extension the term is also used for a project that is not worthwhile, even in a non-economic sense.

Profit